Hagensche Wiek is a cove in the east of the Rügischer Bodden that cuts deeply into the Mönchgut peninsula, the southeast tip of the German island of Rügen.

It is about 5 kilometres long, 2.5 kilometres wide and opens towards the southwest onto the Rügischer Bodden, the northern half of the Bay of Greifswald. In the north, the Hagensche Wiek is bounded by the narrow, elongated peninsula of Reddevitzer Höft, in the south by the actual Mönchgut with the Zicker Hills (Zickersche Berge), up to 66 metres high. In the east the cove approaches within 1,000 metres of the Baltic Sea coast not far from the village of Lobbe in the municipality of Middelhagen.

The municipalities of Gager and Middelhagen with their hamlets of Alt Reddevitz and Mariendorf lie on the Hagensche Wiek. In Gager is the only harbour on the bay, used by fishing and sports boats and protected by a mole. 

The cove is part of the Southeast Rügen Biosphere Reserve.

Bays of Mecklenburg-Western Pomerania
Bays of the Baltic Sea
Geography of Rügen
Bay of Greifswald
Mönchgut